Natsepino is a rural locality (a village) in Novlenskoye Rural Settlement, Vologodsky District, Vologda Oblast, Russia. The population was 12 as of 2002.

Geography 
Natsepino is located 80 km northwest of Vologda (the district's administrative centre) by road. Afanasovo is the nearest rural locality.

References 

Rural localities in Vologodsky District